Ehestandshilfe ("marriage assistance") was a tax levied on unmarried people in Nazi Germany as part of the Nazi state's policy of natalism, and used to contribute to the costs of the marriage loan system. This was levied at a rate of 2–5% of gross annual income on those under 55 who were liable for income tax; under a law of October 16, 1934, it was incorporated into the income tax beginning in January 1935.

References

See also 
 Aes uxorium
 Bachelor tax
 Tax on childlessness

Taxation in Germany
Natalism
Abolished taxes
Taxes promoting marriage and reproduction